The Journal of Humanistic Counseling is a biannual peer-reviewed academic journal published by Wiley-Blackwell on behalf of the Association for Humanistic Counseling, a division of the American Counseling Association. The editor-in-chief is Linwood Vereen (Shippensburg University). The journal focuses on humanistic counseling and development and the promotion of toleration, diversity, and human rights.

History 
The journal was established in 1961 as SPATE: Journal of Student Personnel Association for Teacher Education, a name it retained until 1975. It was then subsequently known as The Humanist Educator (1975–1982), The Journal of Humanistic Education and Development (1982–1999), and The Journal of Humanistic Counseling, Education and Development (1999–2010). It obtained its current name in 2011.

Abstracting and indexing 
The journal is abstracted and indexed in:
 Academic Search Complete
 Education Research Complete
 Education Resources Information Center
 Higher Education Abstracts
 Scopus

External links 
 

English-language journals
Humanistic psychology
Publications established in 1961
Psychology journals
Wiley-Blackwell academic journals
Biannual journals